The City of Carora, commonly called Carora City (in Spanish, Ciudad de Carora), is a city in Lara State, Venezuela, on the Morere River, a branch of the Tocuyo River. It is about 54 miles southwest of Barquisimeto. Carora City was founded twice. The first time, in the year 1569 by Juan de Trejo, but due to constant attacks from the indigenous population, it was abandoned, only to be refounded three years later (1572) by Juan de Salmanca. Carora City flourished in colonial times having a population of nearly 10,000. As of 1911, the neighboring country was devoted principally to raising horses, mules and cattle; in addition to hides and leather, it exported rubber and other forest products.  As of 2005 the main economic activity of the area is still cattle ranching, but on milk production and milk products. In the 1990s grapes and wine making became important.

Notable people
Carora City has been the birthplace of very important people in knowledge different areas. Guitarist players Alirio Diaz and Rodrigo Riera; historians Guillermo Moron, Ismael Silva Montañes, Ambrosio Perera; lawyers Ambrosio Oropeza, Juan Oropeza, Antonio Oropeza; health science Dr. Pastor Oropeza; lawyer and one of the writers of the 1961 Venezuelan Constitution Jose "Cheito" Herrera Oropeza; and Héctor Mujica, writer, journalist, co-founder of the Venezuelan

Education 
Colleges and universities in Carohana City include National Experimental Polytechnic University Antonio Jose de Sucre (UNEXPO), National Open University, and Technological University Institute Mario Briceño Iragorry.

International relations

Twin towns – sister cities
Carora City (Ciudad de Carora) is officially a sister city of  Milwaukee, Wisconsin, United States of America.

References

 
Populated places established in 1569
Populated places established in 1572
Cities in Lara (state)
1569 establishments in the Spanish Empire